The Todd Farm (also known as the Smith-Andrews-Taft-Todd Farm) is an historic farm at 670 Farnum Pike (Greenville Road) in North Smithfield, Rhode Island, US.  The farm includes a house dating to 1740, as well as a collection of outbuildings dating to the early 20th century.  The main block of the house is a -story wood-frame structure, five bays wide, with a gable roof and a large central chimney.  The main block has been added to numerous times, with full-size additions to both sides as well as a sloping addition to the rear, giving the house a saltbox appearance in the rear and a total width of 11 bays.  Behind and beside the house are arrayed a number of small outbuildings, and a barn which has been converted into residential space.  The house was probably built by Noah Smith around 1740, around the time he established a sawmill on Cherry Brook, which runs behind the house and is dammed to form Todd Pond.

The farm was listed on the National Register of Historic Places in 1983.

See also
National Register of Historic Places listings in North Smithfield, Rhode Island

References

Buildings and structures in Providence County, Rhode Island
North Smithfield, Rhode Island
Farms on the National Register of Historic Places in Rhode Island
Houses completed in 1740
Houses on the National Register of Historic Places in Rhode Island
National Register of Historic Places in Providence County, Rhode Island